A Mathematician's Miscellany is an autobiography and collection of anecdotes by John Edensor Littlewood. It is now out of print but Littlewood's Miscellany is its successor, published by Cambridge University Press and edited by Béla Bollobás.

Editions

References 

Biographies and autobiographies of mathematicians